Hit Squad was a 1990s hip hop collective.

Hit Squad may also refer to:

 A team of hired contract killers, especially within the context of organized crime
 Hit Squad (film), a 1976 crime-comedy film
 Da Hit Squad, a professional wrestling tag team
 Hit Squad, a 2003 novel by James Heneghan
 Hit Squad, a 2012 novel by Sophie McKenzie, winner of the Red House Children's Book Award

See also 
 Death squad